The Canton of Remiremont is a French administrative and electoral grouping of communes in the Vosges département of eastern France and in the region of Grand Est. Its administrative centre is at Remiremont.

Composition
At the French canton reorganisation which came into effect in March 2015, the canton was reduced from 16 to 9 communes:
Cleurie
Éloyes
Jarménil
Pouxeux
Raon-aux-Bois
Remiremont
Saint-Amé
Saint-Étienne-lès-Remiremont
Saint-Nabord

References

Remiremont